Aspinwall, including the reduced form Aspinall, is a toponymic surname originating from a place called Aspinwall (also Asmall) in the southern part of Scarisbrick in Lancashire, England, near to Ormskirk and Aughton. The name comes from the Old English æspen ("growing with aspen trees") + wæll(a) ("stream"). In America, the Norwegian surname Asbjørnsen has been assimilated into Aspinwall.

People named Aspinwall 
 Claud Aspinwall (1873–1944), American politician
 Edward Aspinwall (died 1732), English priest
 Homer F. Aspinwall (1846–1919), American politician
 Jack Aspinwall (1933–2015), British politician
 Lisa Aspinwall, American psychologist
 Lloyd Aspinwall (1834–1886), American New York National Guard general
 Martin Aspinwall (born 1981), English rugby league player
 Nan Aspinwall (1880–1964), American equestrian
 Paul S. Aspinwall (born 1964), British theoretical physicist and mathematician
 Reginald Aspinwall (1855–1921), English landscape painter
 Stanhope Aspinwall (1713–1771), British diplomat
 Thomas Aspinwall (consul) (1786–1876), American consul
 Thomas Aspinwall (trade unionist) (1846–1901), British trade unionist
 William Aspinwall (1605–1662), Englishman emigrant to Boston
 William Aspinwall (minister) (active 1648–1662), English nonconformist minister
 William Henry Aspinwall (1807–1875), American businessman

People named Aspinall 
 Aspinall (1840s cricketer)
 Albert Aspinall (1839–1903), Australian stonemason and builder
 Arthur Aspinall (1846–1929), Australian minister
 Butler Cole Aspinall (1830–1875), Australian lawyer
 Damian Aspinall (born 1960), English zoo keeper and casino owner
 Dennis Aspinall (born 1947), Australian rules footballer
 Donald Aspinall (1899–1948), English manufacturer
 Frederick Aspinall (1859–?), English cricketer
 Gordon Aspinall (born 1923), English rugby league player
 Ian Aspinall (born 1961), British actor
 James Aspinall (1795–1861), English clergyman
 Janet Aspinall (born 1959), English cricketer
 Jessie Aspinall (1880–1953), Australian doctor
 John Aspinall (engineer), (1851–1937) English engineer
 John Aspinall (footballer) (born 1959), English footballer
 John Aspinall (politician) ( – 1865), English politician
 John Aspinall (zoo owner), (1926–2000) English zoo owner and gambler
 Joseph Aspinall (1854–1939), New York politician and judge
 Lauren Aspinall (born 1998), Australian squash player
 Michael Aspinall (born 1939), British musicologist
 Mike Aspinall (born 1983), English rugby union player
 Nathan Aspinall (born 1991), English darts player
 Neil Aspinall (1941–2008), British music industry executive
 Nigel Aspinall (born 1946), English croquet player
 Noel Aspinall (1861–1934), Archdeacon of Manchester
 Owen Aspinall (1927–1997), 45th Governor of American Samoa
 Peter Aspinall (born 1994), English rugby league player
 Peter J. Aspinall, social scientist
 Phillip Aspinall (born 1959), Anglican Archbishop of Brisbane, Queensland
 Ron Aspinall (1918–1999), English cricketer
 Septimus Aspinall (1907–1976), rugby league footballer of the 1920s and 1930s
 Tom Aspinall (born 1993), British mixed martial artist
 Vicky Aspinall, English punk musician
 Walter Aspinall (1858–unknown), cricketer
 Warren Aspinall (born 1967), English footballer
 Wayne N. Aspinall (1896–1983), American lawyer and politician; U.S. Representative for Colorado
 William Aspinall, rugby league footballer of the 1960s and 1970s for Keighley
 Willie Aspinall, British rugby league footballer of the 1960s and 1970s

Fictional characters 
 Brett Aspinall, Waterloo Road (TV series) character; son of Roger Aspinall
 Roger Aspinall, Waterloo Road (TV series) character; father of Brett Aspinall

References 

English toponymic surnames